Nelarine Estella Cornelius  (born September 1957) is professor of organisation studies at Queen Mary University of London. She was previously professor of organisation studies at the University of Bradford. Cornelius's research relates to the role of business in society, the development of management methods in emerging economies, and questions of social justice.

Early life
Nelarine Cornelius was born in September 1957. She earned her PhD at the University of Manchester.

Career
Cornelius's early career was in management at General Motors Europe and at the London Borough of Tower Hamlets before she entered academia. She held positions at Brunel University and at the University of Bradford where she was professor of organisation studies. She is currently professor of organisation studies at Queen Mary University of London.

Her research relates to the role of business in society, the development of management methods in emerging economies, and questions of social justice.

She is a fellow of several professional organisations, including the Higher Education Academy, the British Academy of Management, and the Royal Society of Arts, and is a member of the Black Female Professors Forum.

Selected publications
 Challenging the boundaries: Personal construct psychology for the new millennium. Lostock Hall, ECPA Publication, 2000. (Edited with J. Fisher)
 Human Resource Management, London: Thomson, London, 2000. (Editor)
 Building workplace equality: ethics, diversity and inclusion. Thomson, London, 2002.

References

External links 
http://brad.academia.edu/NelarineCornelius
https://www.researchgate.net/profile/Nelarine_Cornelius

Living people
Academics of Queen Mary University of London
Academics of the University of Bradford
1957 births
Black British women academics
Fellows of the Higher Education Academy
Place of birth missing (living people)
Nationality missing
Alumni of the University of Manchester